Lukewarm or The Lukewarm may refer to:

Lukewarm (Porridge), a fictional character from the BBC series Porridge
"2 + 2 = 5" (song), a 2003 song by Radiohead alternatively titled "The Lukewarm"
"The Lukewarm," a song by Omar Rodríguez-López from his album Se Dice Bisonte, No Búfalo (2007)
Luke Warm, pseudonym for English musician Jo Callis while he was in The Rezillos
Lukewarm, an album of rarities released by the band Ookla the Mok in 2022